Tirawa may refer to:
 Tirawa (god) (also Atius Tirawa) was the creator god of the Pawnee people
 Tirawa (crater), a large impact basin on Saturn's moon Rhea